The Co-Cathedral of the Sacred Heart is a place of worship located at 1111 St. Joseph Parkway in downtown Houston. The co-cathedral seats 1,820 people in its  sanctuary.  Together with the venerable St. Mary's Cathedral Basilica in Galveston, Sacred Heart serves more than 1.2 million Roman Catholics in the Archdiocese of Galveston-Houston.

Establishment as a Co-Cathedral 
In 1847, Pope Pius IX established the Diocese of Galveston for the 20,000 Catholics who lived in the new state of Texas. This new diocese covered an area as large as France and was served by one bishop and ten missionary priests. Construction of the second St. Mary's parish began in 1847 in Galveston and in 1848 it was dedicated as St. Mary's Cathedral of the newly established diocese of Galveston.  St. Mary's was the first catholic Cathedral in the state of Texas and for over 100 years it was the only cathedral in the Diocese of Galveston.

Due to the tremendous growth in the city of Houston, in 1959, the Holy See permitted the Most Reverend Wendelin J. Nold, fifth bishop of the Galveston Diocese, to erect a cathedral of convenience in the city. Because of its central location, he chose Sacred Heart Church, built in 1911, to serve as co-cathedral and installed an episcopal chair. This did not change the status of the City of Galveston as an Episcopal see, however it did permit full pontifical ceremonies to be held in Houston, as well as Galveston. Both cathedrals are co-equal in rank; however, since St. Mary's is the original Cathedral for the State of Texas, it has the distinction of being the Mother Cathedral for all the Catholic dioceses in Texas.

In 1979, in recognition of the Galveston Cathedral's importance to the community and state, as well as its historical role as the mother church for Catholicism in the state of Texas, Pope John Paul II elevated St. Mary's to the status of Cathedral Basilica.

History of Sacred Heart Parish 

The third Bishop of Galveston, Nicholas A. Gallagher, established Sacred Heart parish in downtown Houston as the fourth parish in the city on November 22, 1896, to serve the growing Catholic population. The Reverend Thomas Keaney, became the first pastor of Sacred Heart Church.

On March 11, 1897, Keaney purchased property facing Pierce and Fannin Streets and architect Olle J. Lorehn drew plans for a gothic-style church.  However, construction on Lorehn's design would not begin until 1911. To serve the congregation in the interim, a small church was built on the corner of Pierce and San Jacinto Streets. Bishop Gallagher laid the cornerstone for the temporary sanctuary on May 16, 1897, and dedicated it on November 6, 1897.

On June 11, 1911, Bishop Gallagher laid the cornerstone of the present Sacred Heart Church. The church was dedicated to God's service on April 14, 1912, at a final cost of $96,669. The new Sacred Heart Church accommodated 800 people, and was three stories. After the completion of the new Sacred Heart, the temporary church became the school building.

Father Morgan J. Crow, the fourth pastor of Sacred Heart, constructed a two-story, brick rectory that was completed and occupied in 1920 to replace the wooden structure. In 1922, the original church building was demolished to make way for a new school building at a cost of $52,800.

Monsignor Jerome A. Rapp, the fifth pastor of Sacred Heart (1927–1952), oversaw much of the interior decoration of the church including acquiring statuary.  His successor, Monsignor John J. Roach, installed central heating and air-conditioning in 1953 and in 1954, expanded the parish footprint by acquiring adjacent property at Fannin and Calhoun Streets.  With this purchase, the parish owned an entire city block.

Monsignor Roach had the exteriors of the church and school refurbished in 1957, enlarged the sacristy and made other alterations in addition to constructing a new rectory.  In 1964, he oversaw renovation of the interior of Sacred Heart.

The final interior renovation of the Co-Cathedral was completed in 1990 with the rededication on March 25, 1990, by Bishop Joseph A. Fiorenza.  Changes included a new episcopal chair and a total of three new mosaics that were designed and made in Italy. The first mosaic is of Christ the pantocrator above the episcopal chair represents Jesus as the shepherd and teacher of the church. The second mosaic is a Eucharistic symbol taken from the miracle of the multiplication of the five loaves and two fish. Above this mosaic is the Coat of Arms for the late Pope John Paul II. The third mosaic depicts a baptismal theme and the death and resurrection of Christ. The three mosaics were installed by Italo Botti of Chicago.

Under Father Troy Gately, in December 2006, the Co-Cathedral parish purchased the former Federal Reserve Bank Building, adjacent to the new Co-Cathedral for $5 million, and named it Cathedral Centre.  It will replace the 1922 Sacred Heart School building to house classrooms, offices, parish hall, youth rooms, child care center, music rooms, library, and a cafeteria. The parish is expected to spend another $2 million on renovations for the new Cathedral Centre.

Construction of the new Sacred Heart Co-Cathedral 

By the 2000s, the archdiocese had long outgrown the 90-year-old Co-Cathedral of the Sacred Heart. Since it was constructed as a parish church, it had been enlarged over the years through a patchwork of renovations and additions and rather than make more costly additions, the Archdiocese decided to construct a new Co-Cathedral of the Sacred Heart.

Ziegler Cooper Architects of Houston was selected to design and Linbeck Group was selected as general contractor. In the spring of 2002, design began for the new co-cathedral.  Working with Joseph Fiorenza, then Bishop of Galveston-Houston, a model was constructed of the final design concept. Bishop Fiorenza took a picture of the co-cathedral model to the Vatican where he reportedly obtained approval of the design from Pope John Paul II.

On January 30, 2005, newly elevated Archbishop Fiorenza presided over a groundbreaking ceremony for the new co-cathedral and construction began shortly afterwards. The new Sacred Heart serves the archdiocese as both an ecclesiastical and civic center.

The co-cathedral seats 1,820 with room for an additional 200 temporary chairs. The co-cathedral is designed in a simplified Italian Romanesque style with a cruciform shape. The exterior dome is clad in copper and capped by a gilded crucifix while the interior features an  occulus depicting the Holy Spirit in stained glass. One hundred and eight stained glass panels and windows, including those in the Clerestory, were designed and constructed in Florence, Italy by Mellini Art Glass and Mosaics.

Most Reverend Joseph A. Fiorenza, now Archbishop Emeritus of the Galveston-Houston Archdiocese oversaw construction of the new co-cathedral.

The existence of the Sacred Heart Co-Cathedral does not affect the status of St. Mary's Cathedral Basilica in Galveston. Both the cathedral and co-cathedral will continue to serve the needs of the citizens of the archdiocese.

On April 2, 2008, the New Co-Cathedral of the Sacred Heart open its doors with a dedication Mass, attended by Bishops and Cardinals from across the United States and around the world. The new Co-Cathedral was dedicated to the Sacred Heart of Jesus by Cardinal Daniel DiNardo Archbishop of Galveston-Houston and Archbishop Joseph A. Fiorenza. The final cost of the new Co-Cathedral of the Sacred Heart was US$49,000,000.

Awards 

Since construction of the Co-Cathedral was completed in April 2008, Linbeck Group (the General Contractor) has been awarded numerous accolades for its work on the project. The list of awards includes, the 2008 ASA Excellence in Construction Award, 2008 AGC Standard of Excellence Award, 2008 CSI Houston Craftsmanship Award, 2008 AGC Houston Apex Award, 2008 TBB AGC Outstanding Construction Award, 2008 Texas Construction Judges Award, 2008 McGraw-Hill Best of the Best Award and 2009 AGC Build America Award.

Future use of the old Sacred Heart Co-Cathedral 
Shortly after the opening of the new structure, the archdiocese announced that the 1912 church building that served as the Co-Cathedral would be demolished and the site would become a parking lot for the new church. However, due to an outcry from parishioners and preservationists, the Archdiocese of Galveston-Houston has sought ways to use the former church building.

In 2004, Preservation Texas added Sacred Heart to the 2004 list of Texas' Most Endangered Historic Places. In addition, The Greater Houston Preservation Alliance (GHPA) a local organization in Houston did the same.

The Archdiocese announced plans in late 2007 to demolish the 1922 Sacred Heart School building to provide parking for the new Co-Cathedral across San Jacinto Street. A master plan includes the eventual demolition of the former school building for a parking lot and the removal of the parking lot behind the old church to replace the asphalt parking lot with a landscaped park to be known as Cathedral Green. There are no current plans for the removal of the rectory or the old church building. However, it is possible that 1957 rectory and the 1912 Sacred Heart Church building may be saved. The Archdiocese at this point has not made a final decision on the future of the old Sacred Heart, but the final decision is in the hands of Cardinal DiNardo.

The original sanctuary is no longer used for services. For a short time after the opening of the new structure, weddings were permitted at the old Co-Cathedral. However, the Archdiocese has moved all activities to the new Co-Cathedral Church.

See also 
List of Catholic cathedrals in the United States
List of cathedrals in the United States
St. Mary's Cathedral Basilica - Mother Cathedral of Texas and the Archdiocese of Galveston-Houston.
Christianity in Houston
Galveston, Texas
Houston, Texas

Footnotes

External links

Official Cathedral Site
Archdiocese of Galveston-Houston Official Site
St. Mary's Cathedral Basilica
Co-Cathedral of The Sacred Heart

Sacred Heart Houston
Roman Catholic Archdiocese of Galveston–Houston
Roman Catholic churches in Houston
Religious organizations established in 1896
Roman Catholic churches completed in 2008
21st-century Roman Catholic church buildings in the United States
Cathedrals in Houston
Downtown Houston